Brasstronaut was a band from Vancouver, British Columbia, Canada, with roots in pop, rock and jazz. It was formed in 2007. Their line-up was Bryan Davies on trumpet, Edo Van Breemen on piano and vocals, Sam Davidson on clarinet and EWI, Tariq Hussain on lap steel and electric guitar, Brennan Saul on drums and John Walsh on bass.

History

Old World Lies
Brasstronaut's first release, the EP Old World Lies, was released in 2008 on Unfamiliar Records and received  positive press and blog response. It was accompanied by a video for the song "Requiem for a Scene". On October 20, 2010, Brasstronaut performed a version of Old World Lies on a balcony in London for the viral music show BalconyTV.

Mount Chimaera
The band spent early 2009 in Banff, Alberta, recording their first full-length album as part of a Winter Music Creative Residency at the Banff Centre. After postponing the release date of September 23, they revamped and re-recorded some of the songs in private studios in Vancouver and finally released Mount Chimaera on March 2, 2010.

The tracks Old World Lies and Requiem for a Scene were used in the soundtrack for the game WET.

Brasstronaut's members went on to become active in music education and music therapy. Van Breemen, who composed the jingle for Sprott Shaw College, has become a composer for film and television productions.

Discography
Studio albums
2010 – Mount Chimaera (Unfamiliar Records)
2012 – Mean Sun (Unfamiliar Records)
2016 – Brasstronaut (Hybridity Music)

EPs
2008 – Old World Lies (Unfamiliar Records)
2011 – Opportunity (Digital Kunstrasen)

Singles
"Old World Lies"
"Requiem for a Scene"
"Mean Sun"
"Bounce"
"The Grove"
"Raveshadow"
"Hawk"
"Sooner Or Later"

Awards
Mount Chimaera was long-listed for the 2010 Polaris Music Prize.

"Hearts Trompet" from Mount Chimaera won the SOCAN Songwriting Prize in 2010.

References

External links
 (defunct)

Canadian electronic music groups
Canadian indie pop groups
Musical groups from Vancouver
Musical groups established in 2007
2007 establishments in British Columbia